Góry (meaning "mountains" in Slavic languages) may refer to the following:

Places

Poland

Greater Poland Voivodeship
Góry, Konin County
Góry, Słupca County

Łódź Voivodeship
Góry, Poddębice County
Góry, Wieruszów County

Lublin Voivodeship
Góry, Krasnystaw County
Góry, Puławy County
Góry, Gmina Urzędów
Góry, Gmina Zakrzówek

Masovian Voivodeship
Góry, Białobrzegi County
Góry, Mińsk County
Góry, Siedlce County
Góry, Ostrołęka County

Warmian-Masurian Voivodeship
Góry, Braniewo County
Góry, Węgorzewo County

Other voivodeships
Góry, Kuyavian-Pomeranian Voivodeship, north-central Poland
Góry, Lower Silesian Voivodeship, south-west Poland
Góry, Podlaskie Voivodeship, north-east Poland
Góry, Świętokrzyskie Voivodeship, south-central Poland
Góry, West Pomeranian Voivodeship, north-west Poland

Other places
Gory, Mali, Kayes Region, western Mali

People
 Gory Guerrero (1921–1990), an American professional wrestler
 Hippolyte Louis Gory (1800-1852), a French entomologist

See also
 
 Gore (disambiguation)
 Gorey (disambiguation)
 Gori (disambiguation)
 Gory Gory Hallelujah, a 2003 American film directed by Sue Corcoran
 Jouri, an Arabic female name